Nhlangano is the fourth largest town in Eswatini. It is the capital of the southern district of Shiselweni.  The town was formerly known as Goedgegun, but the name was changed to Nhlangano, meaning "the meeting place". Nhlangano is located beside the Ngwavuma River. King George VI of the United Kingdom met with King Sobhuza in the town in 1947 to thank him for the war effort during the Second World War.

Nhlangano has a health center, a prison, a casino and an SOS Children's Village.

See also
Nhlangano AIDS Training Information and Counseling Center

Notes

Populated places in Shiselweni Region